Carol Ann Susi (February 2, 1952 – November 11, 2014) was an American actress whose career spanned 40 years. Her best known roles were probably her first and last; she debuted as the recurring character of semi-competent but likable intern Monique Marmelstein on Kolchak: The Night Stalker.  More than three decades and countless supporting roles later, her level of celebrity was elevated for having provided the voice of recurring off-screen character Mrs. Wolowitz, mother of Howard Wolowitz, on the television series The Big Bang Theory.

Career
Susi made her first on-screen appearance in Kolchak: The Night Stalker, where she played the recurring role of intern Monique Marmelstein. Other television and film credits included: McMillan & Wife, Coyote Ugly, Just Go with It, The Big Bang Theory, Cheers, Becker, the 1990 biker comedy Masters of Menace, Grey's Anatomy, That '70s Show, Out of Practice, Cats & Dogs, Just Shoot Me, Married... with Children, Night Court, The King of Queens, Death Becomes Her, NYPD Blue, Seinfeld, The Secret of My Success, My Blue Heaven, and Sabrina, the Teenage Witch. She also had extensive experience in live theatre and voiced a character on the video game installment of CSI: NY.

Personal life
Carol Ann Susi was born to an Italian-American family in Brooklyn, She graduated from Franklin Delano Roosevelt High School in Brooklyn in 1970. She studied acting at HB Studio in New York City before moving to Los Angeles in the 1970s.

Death
Susi died of cancer on November 11, 2014, in Los Angeles, California, at age 62. She had been diagnosed a week before her death. She is interred at the Saint Charles Cemetery in East Farmingdale, New York. Her character on The Big Bang Theory, Mrs. Wolowitz, was mourned, as the character passed in the series' eighth-season episode "The Comic Book Store Regeneration" broadcast on February 19, 2015.

Filmography

Film

Television

Video games

References

External links 

1952 births
2014 deaths
20th-century American actresses
21st-century American actresses
Actresses from Los Angeles
Actresses from New York City
American film actresses
American people of Italian descent
American television actresses
American video game actors
American voice actresses
Deaths from cancer in California
People from Brooklyn